Axe Cop is an American adult animated series based on the webcomic of the same name that was created by Ethan Nicolle and Malachai Nicolle. It premiered on Fox on July 21, 2013, as a part of the channel's Animation Domination HD programming block. The first season consists of 12 11-minute episodes. The second, broadcast in April—June 2015 on FXX consists of 10 episodes.

Plot
Similar to the webcomic, the series features the eponymous police officer, his partner Flute Cop, and their allies Sockarang, Gray Diamond, Liborg, Bat Warthog Man, and Wexter as they fight various "bad guys" and avoid getting into conflict with the Normal Police.

Development
Axe Cop is a popular webcomic that was created by Ethan Nicolle and his young brother Malachai (five years old at the time of its creation). In playing with Malachai, Ethan found that his brother had a vivid and disjointed imagination, and developed the comic by taking the stories that Malachai told, refining the story to some point without losing Malachai's inventiveness, and drawing the comic around it. The webcomic became very popular, leading to publishing deals with Dark Horse Comics for larger comic-book-sized stories.

The development of the Axe Cop series started from a conversation that Nick Offerman had with the ADHD producer Nick Weidenfeld some years before the program's debut. Offerman talked with Weidenfeld about the Axe Cop comic and stated that if a show was to be made from it, Offerman wanted to participate. Weidenfeld took the idea to Phil Lord and Chris Miller, also fans of the webcomic, and they asked Weidenfeld to lead the project, stating that it "has to be emotional", in Weidenfeld's words. As Lord and Miller were working on 21 Jump Street at the time, they suggested Weidenfeld turn to Judah Miller for directional help. Weidenfeld and Miller arranged for a retreat along with writers and creators of Drawn Together Dave Jeser and Matt Silverstein, voice actors Ken Marino, Patton Oswalt, and Offerman, and the comic creator Ethan Nicolle, where the group discussed their favorite parts of the comic and how to translate it into a show, keeping all the moments that are "100-percent pure Malachai". As they started to write some of the show's plots, they found themselves with narrative dead ends; Ethan used these moments to contact Malachai, explain the story so far and have Malachai provide the missing narrative. Malachai also provided additional advice during the animation process for the shorts when he visited the studios, such as insisting that Zombie Island be set in space, a tangent that the writers and animators quickly agreed with for its illogical humorous value and included in the short.

Episodes

Season 1 (2013)
The initial episode order for the series was six. On August 1, 2013, Fox ordered six additional episodes, bringing the season to a total of 12 episodes.

Season 2 (2015)

Voice cast
 Nick Offerman – Axe Cop/Axey Smartist
 Ken Marino – Flute Cop/Flutey Smartist, Fife Cop (ep. 3)
 Rob Huebel – Gray Diamond/Mark Frankenstein
 Megan Mullally – Anita, Mrs. G. (ep. 1), Joanie (ep. 1), Isabella M. (ep. 2), Queen of England (ep. 2), Book Cop's Mom (ep. 3), Gobber Smartist (ep. 5), Tracy (ep. 8), Waitress (ep. 9)
 Patton Oswalt – Sockarang, Stockarang (ep. 3)
 Tyler, The Creator – Liborg, Chief of the Normal Police (ep. 7)

Additional voices
 James Adomian – Book Cop's Dad (ep. 3), Magic Cop (ep. 4)
 Jane Adams – Red-Headed Woman (ep. 8)
 Dave "Gruber" Allen – 
 Dee Bradley Baker – Vampire Man Baby Kid (ep. 13), Baboons (ep. 22)
 Maria Bamford – Newscaster (ep. 15), Anita (ep. 22)
 Jonathan Banks – Book Cop (ep. 3), Radio DJ (ep. 4)
 Raymond J. Barry – Bad Santa (ep. 5)
 Todd Barry – Dinosaur Horn Store Salesman (ep. 1), Todd (ep. 6)
 Stephanie Beatriz – 
 Lake Bell – Axe Girl (ep. 20)
 Beck Bennett – Boy's Father (ep. 6)
 Andrew Daly –
 Travis Bowe – 
 Betsy Brandt – 
 Andre Braugher – Lobster Man (ep. 16)
 Alison Brie – Beautiful Girly Bobs (ep. 12)
 Clancy Brown – Soldier (ep. 17), Reporter (ep. 18), Junior Cobbb (ep. 18), Satan (ep. 19), Bigfoot (ep. 21), Bad Hunter (ep. 21)
 Jerrod Carmichael – Guy on Car (ep. 4)
 Michael Chiklis – 
 Olivia Cooke – Loch Ness Monster (ep. 21)
 Charley Damski – Alien Lab Worker (ep. 1)
 Sam Elliott – Axe Cop's Dad (ep. 19)
 Giancarlo Esposito – Army Chihuahua
 Dan Harmon – Magic Show Audience Member (ep. 4)
 Dennis Haysbert – Frog (ep. 8)
 Jared Harris – King of England (ep. 3)
 Ryan Hurst – 
 Dave Jeser –
 Jewel – Tear Sparrow (ep. 16)
 Vincent Kartheiser – Bat Warthog Man
 Udo Kier – Warden (ep. 14)
 Jemima Kirke – Water Queen (ep. 16)
 Heather Lawless – Dr. Miles (ep. 22)
 Al LeVine – President Towzerd (ep. 15, 22)
 Luenell – Waitress (ep. 20)
 Michael Madsen – Baby Man
 Hunter Maki – Young Flutey Smartist (ep. 11)
 Jack McBrayer – Mr. Chicken Chickenslice (ep. 19)
 Cullen McCarthy – Young Axey Smartist (ep. 11), Young Ray (ep. 11)
 Jack McGee – Turkey Turkey (ep. 10)
 Scoot McNairy – Scoot (ep. 9, 15)
 Ben Mendelsohn – Ben (ep. 9, 15)
 Chris Messina – 
 Alfred Molina – Vampire Man Baby Kid's Father (ep. 13), Brilliant Evil Scientist (ep. 18)
 Ethan Nicolle – Chubby Doll (ep. 4), Merman (ep. 5)
 Malachai Nicolle – Opening Narration
 Mike O'Malley – Ray (ep. 11)
 Jordan Peele – Super Axe (ep. 8)
 Richard Riehle – Tutukaka Male (ep. 20), Science Corp Scientist (ep. 22), Secret President Larry (ep. 22)
 Alex Rubin – Kid (ep. 6)
 Kristen Schaal – God (ep. 19)
 Peter Serafinowicz – Uni-Man, Dr. Doo Doo (ep. 2), Adolf Hitler (ep. 2), Chemist M. (ep. 2), Redcoat (ep. 3), Boy (ep. 6), Rabbit Ghost (ep. 6), King of All Time (ep. 16), Wizard Artist Rabbit (ep. 18)
 Matt Silverstein – 
 June Squibb – Tutukaka Female (ep. 20)
 David Strathairn – Extincter (ep. 21)
 Tara Strong – Refugee Woman (ep. 22)
 Valery Summey – Poison (ep. 4)
 Joe Unger – Police Officer (ep. 9), Farmer (ep. 10)
 Deborah Ann Woll – Best Fairy Ever (ep. 12)
 Dwight Yoakam –

References

External links
 
 Axe Cop on Reddit

2010s American adult animated television series
2010s American animated comedy television series
2010s American police comedy television series
2013 American television series debuts
2015 American television series endings
American adult animated action television series
American adult animated comedy television series
Anime-influenced Western animated television series
English-language television shows
Television series by 20th Century Fox Television
Television series by Fox Television Animation
Television shows based on webcomics